is a 2015 Japanese comedy-drama science fiction mystery film directed by Sion Sono. It is the third adaptation of the seinen manga series Minna! Esper Dayo! written and illustrated by Kiminori Wakasugi, following a 2013 TV series and a TV movie special earlier in 2015. It was released in Japan on September 4, 2015.

Premise
Kamogawa Yoshirō is a teenage Japanese virgin whose life is changed by a cosmic event. While fantasizing about his dream girl, Yoshirō receives a cosmic blast while masturbating. At school he finds himself able to read other people's thoughts and joins a group of psychic virgins in order to defend the world from evil psychics using his newfound psychic powers.

Cast

Shōta Sometani as Yoshirō Kamogawa
Mika Akizuki as Yuko
Tokio Emoto as Yasu
Motoki Fukami as Yosuke Enomoto
Mizuki Hoshina as Taeko
Rika Hoshina as Saya
Elaiza Ikeda as Miyuki Hirano
Ai Shinozaki as Keiko
Tomomi Itano as Eri
Megumi Kagurazaka as Ms. Akiyama
Cyborg Kaori as Protester Sexy Cosplayer
Anna Konno as Mitsuko Mitsui
Erina Mano as Sae Asami
Reiya Masaki as Yabe Naoya
Ijiri Okada as Yoshiro's Dad
Izumi Okamura as Protester Sexy Cosplayer
Sahel Rosa as Julie Babcock
Tsutomu Sekine as Taeko's Partner
Konona Shiba as Protester Sexy Cosplyer
Airi Shimizu as Shizuka
Rena Shimura as Mano
Yuka Someya
Makita Sports as Teru
Maryjun Takahashi as Aiko Polnareff
Kōhei Takeda as Topless Guy with Topless Ladies
Ami Tomite as Akiko Kamiya
Mariko Tsutsui as Ritsuko
Ken Yasuda as Prof. Asami

Production
It is Sion Sono's third adaptation of the manga source material Minna! Esper Dayo! by Kiminori Wakasugi. The first live-action drama adaptation of the manga premiered in April 2013 as a 12-part live-action TV drama. A live-action spinoff television special titled All Esper Dayo! SP aired in Japan on April 3, 2015. This theatrical adaptation, titled Eiga Minna! Esper Dayo! featured some differences in the members of the cast from those earlier television adaptations, most notably Elaiza Ikeda replacing Kaho as Miyuki Hirano.

Release
The film was released in Japan on September 4, 2015, just a few months after Sion Sono's TV special All Esper Dayo! SP based on the manga. It was also featured at multiple international festivals, including the Busan International Film Festival on October 2, 2015, the Sitges Film Festival (where Sion Sono also presented Tag and Love & Peace) on October 11, 2015, the Buenos Aires Film Festival on April 21, 2016, the Future Film Festival in Italy on May 5, 2016, the Edinburgh International Film Festival on June 20, 2016, and the Eejanaika Toyohashi Film Festival on March 5, 2017.

Reception
Critics generally found that the film was full of sexual innuendo and discussion but did not contain actual nudity or sex.
Justin Chang of Variety.com called the film an "occasionally endearing, often supremely irritating movie" and ultimately found that it "is a bit like having a dog hump your leg for the better part of two hours; it's filthy and monotonous and fairly interminable, but after a while you've been so thoroughly numbed that you have to admit it's kind of sweet."
Wendy Ide of Screen Daily wrote, "For all its cosplay sex slaves, mountains of blow up dolls and frenzied masturbation, this is as tame, and in many ways as innocent, as a Benny Hill sketch."

References

External links

2015 films
2010s mystery comedy-drama films
2010s science fiction comedy-drama films
2010s Japanese films
2010s Japanese-language films
Japanese high school films
Japanese mystery comedy-drama films
Japanese science fiction comedy-drama films
Japanese science fantasy films
Films directed by Sion Sono
Live-action films based on manga
Films about psychic powers